Tian Yu (c. 171 – c. 252), courtesy name Guorang, was a military general of the state of Cao Wei during the Three Kingdoms period of China.

Life 
Tian Yu was from Yongnu County, Yuyang Commandery, which is present-day Wuqing District, Tianjin. During Liu Bei's stay with Gongsun Zan, the young Tian Yu placed himself under Liu Bei's foster care, and Liu Bei was greatly impressed by Tian Yu. When Tian Yu left to care for his ageing mother, Liu Bei tearfully expressed his regret at not being able to work with Tian Yu.

Later Tian Yu served under Gongsun Zan as the Prefect of Dongzhou County. One of Gongsun Zan's generals, Wang Men, betrayed Gongsun Zan and joined Yuan Shao, and lead an attack on his former master with more than 10,000 troops. Tian Yu personally visited Wang Men and managed to shame the latter into retreating. Although Gongsun Zan knew of Tian Yu's intellect, he could not appoint important roles for Tian Yu. After Gongsun Zan's defeat, Tian Yu's friend Xianyu Fu hired him as an adjutant. He recommended that Xianyu Fu join Cao Cao, who subsequently hired Tian Yu as well in various official positions.

See also
 Lists of people of the Three Kingdoms

References

 Chen, Shou (3rd century). Records of Three Kingdoms (Sanguozhi).
 Pei, Songzhi (5th century). Annotations to Records of the Three Kingdoms (Sanguozhi zhu).

171 births
252 deaths
Generals under Cao Cao
Cao Wei generals
Cao Wei politicians
Political office-holders in Henan
Political office-holders in Shanxi
Han dynasty politicians from Tianjin
Han dynasty generals from Tianjin
Officials under Cao Cao
Officials under Liu Bei